Justice Lee may refer to:

Dan M. Lee (1926–2010), associate justice of the Supreme Court of Mississippi
George Hay Lee (1807–1873), associate justice of the Virginia Court of Appeals
Percy Mercer Lee (c. 1893–1969), justice and chief justice  of the Supreme Court of Mississippi
Roy Noble Lee (1915–2015), chief justice of the Supreme Court of Mississippi
Sharon G. Lee (born 1953), associate justice of the Tennessee Supreme Court
T. Bailey Lee (1873−1948), associate justice of the Idaho Supreme Court
Thomas Rex Lee (born 1964), associate justice of the Utah Supreme Court
William Lee (English judge) (1688–1754), Lord Chief Justice of the King's Bench
William A. Lee (judge) (1859–1926), associate justice of the Idaho Supreme Court
William E. Lee (Idaho) (1882–1955), associate justice of the Idaho Supreme Court
William Little Lee (1821–1857), first chief justice of the Supreme Court for the Kingdom of Hawaii

See also
Justice Lea (disambiguation)